The 1953 Auburn Tigers football team represented Auburn University in the 1953 college football season. It was the Tigers' 62nd overall and 21st season as a member of the Southeastern Conference (SEC). The team was led by head coach Ralph "Shug" Jordan, in his third year, and played their home games at Cliff Hare Stadium in Auburn, the Cramton Bowl in Montgomery and Ladd Memorial Stadium in Mobile, Alabama. They finished with a record of seven wins, three losses and one tie (7–3–1 overall, 4–2–1 in the SEC) and with a loss to Texas Tech in the Gator Bowl.

Schedule

Source: 1953 Auburn football schedule

Notable players

Vince Dooley 
Serving as team captain, Dooley played quarterback and corner back for the 53' Auburn Tigers. Vince completed 25 of 47 passes for a 53.1 completion percentage. This was the best mark by an Auburn signal caller since All-American Travis Tidwell. Dooley was named to the Senior Bowl at the conclusion of the season and was invited to the annual Blue-Gray Game. He was named Offensive MVP after the Gator Bowl.

Ed Baker 
Big Ed was named team co-captain to the 1953 Auburn Tigers. He opened up running lanes for future All-SEC back Fob James and was voted the SEC's "Best Offensive Center" at the conclusion of the regular season.

References

Auburn
Auburn Tigers football seasons
Auburn Tigers football